Garh Ganesh Temple is an 18th-century temple of Lord Ganesh in the city of Jaipur. It is located on the hills near Nahargarh Fort and Jaigarh Fort.

Garh Ganesha temple is devoted to Lord Ganesha. Devotees believe that Ganesha is present in the temple in the form of a small child – Purushakriti. Located at the top in the Aravali hills, close to the Nahargarh hill. In the Garh Ganesha temple, Lord Ganesha is established in the statue of child Ganesha – Vigra Purushakriti (without trunk).

The temple was built by Maharaja Swai Jai Singh II when he performed the "Ashwamegha Yagya" before the establishment of Jaipur. He made the shrine and placed the statue of Lord Ganesha. After that he kept the foundation stone of Jaipur. He also kept the statue in such a way that Maharaja could be able to see the statue with the help of binoculars from the Chandra Mahal of City Palace, Jaipur. Garh Ganesh also has ‘Dhwajadheesh’ Ganesha's temple of Bari-Chaupar as its part.

On the Ganesh Chaturthi in Bhadrapad Shukla Paksha, the fair of five days is organized every year. Also on the first Wednesday after Diwali, anna-koot is celebrated on the temple and on last Wednesday 'Paush month' is celebrated by organizing 'Paush bade'.

The total arrangement and management of the temple is overlooked by the Audhchya family. Presently, Shri Pradeep Audichya, the 13th priest of the temple, is the chief priest.

References 

Hindu temples in Rajasthan
Hindu temples in Jaipur
18th-century Hindu temples